The Warriner School is a coeducational secondary school situated on the edge of Bloxham, Oxfordshire, England. The school was founded in 1971 and now has 1,500 pupils in the 11–18 age range, having opened a sixth form in September 2013. It has Technology College status and serves the villages in the northern half of the Cherwell District. It is notable for operating a large school farm.

Farming and rural studies
The school premises contain a farm,  in size and fully organic for livestock and grassland. The school has won the NFU's Rural School Of The Year Award 2005 and SSAT's Most Improved Schools Club Award 2005-06. The farm sells its produce, including, meat, eggs, and livestock, although school farm produce is not used for student consumption. In late 2015, the Warriner School farm shop closed down due to lack of sales. The farm itself still runs.

The Warriner Farm is also useful to student education, as Rural Studies lessons can be held out on the farm, giving the teachers the ability to demonstrate with live animals.

Partnership and academy status
A school partnership is a group of schools that are usually primary schools feeding into the same secondary school.

The Warriner Partnership contains the following schools: 
 Bishop Loveday School in Bodicote, Oxfordshire
 Bishop Carpenter School in North Newington, Oxfordshire
 Sibford Gower Endowed Primary School in Sibford Gower, Oxfordshire
 Christopher Rawlins School in Adderbury, Oxfordshire
 Hornton School in Hornton
 Bloxham Primary School in Bloxham, Oxfordshire
 Shenington School in Shenington, Oxfordshire
 Wroxton School in Wroxton, Oxfordshire
 Dr Radcliffes School in Steeple Aston, Oxfordshire
 Deddington School in Deddington, Oxfordshire

In August 2015, The Warriner School converted to academy status and is now part of The Warriner Multi Academy Trust.

February 2023 protests 
On 24th February 2023, the students of Warriner School began to protest by not attending lessons and shouting, chanting and unpeacefully protesting around the school site. This anger was sparked by an e-mail sent to all the parents of Warriner students the evening before, stating that starting September 2023 girls were not allowed to wear skirts anymore, and that girls would instead have to wear black trousers.

Executive Headteacher Dr Annabel Kay published a press release later that day, which is as follows:“Today, our students organised a protest against a change to our uniform policy due to be implemented from September 2023. We fully respect the rights of students to protest and we want to hear the voices of young people in a safe and constructive manner".

“We underestimated the strength of feeling on this issue and recognise that we haven’t properly engaged or consulted with all parents and students. For this, we apologise. Our intention was, and remains the case, to be inclusive, supporting and empowering all our students equally and with respect".

“We have listened to our students today and we are committed to engaging further on our uniform policy, and on other future policy changes, with both parents and students in a constructive and positive manner.”The Banbury Guardian, Oxfordshire Live,The BBC, The Telegraph, The Independent, The Mirror, The Daily Mail, Oxford Mail, The Northampton Chronicle and Banbury FM all published articles on the protests.

Notable alumni 
Lloyd Sabin (born 1994), cricketer
 Jo Joyner, actress, notably starring in long-running soap opera EastEnders, Ackley Bridge and Shakespeare & Hathaway: Private Investigators
Oliver Hall (born 2002), politician, notably stood as the Conservative Party candidate for Mayor of Hackney in the 2022 Local Elections, becoming the youngest-ever Mayoral candidate in England and Wales.

References

External links
Warriner School website
Warriner School's Farm Website
Warriner Primaries Website

Secondary schools in Oxfordshire
Educational institutions established in 1971
1971 establishments in England
Academies in Oxfordshire